Mimulopsis arborescens is a tree from the family Acanthaceae and a species of the genus Mimulopsis. This tree is one of the species that can be found at Rwenzori Mountains.

References

External links

Acanthaceae
Flora of East Tropical Africa
Flora of South Tropical Africa
Flora of West-Central Tropical Africa
Albertine Rift montane forests